Volucella inanis is a species of hoverfly belonging to the family Syrphidae.

Distribution
This species is present in most of Europe, in eastern Palearctic realm, in the Near East and in North Africa.

Description

They have three yellow bands on an otherwise black abdomen and thus closely resemble wasps in a form of mimicry. The first two bands are completely or partially interrupted by a black wedge. The head has feather-like antennae and the wings have darkened patches in the middle and on the tip.

Biology
Volucella inanis can be encountered from early July to early September, feeding on flowers of species such as yarrow (Achillea millefolium), dill (Anethum graveolens), heather (Erica species), thistles (genera Carduus, Cirsium, and Onopordum) and Buddleja davidii.

The female lays eggs in the nests of social wasps and hornets (Vespa crabro, Vespula germanica, etc.). The larvae of this hoverfly are ectoparasites of larvae of the wasps.

References

External links
 
 Biolib
 Volucella

Diptera of Africa
Diptera of Asia
Diptera of Europe
Volucella
Insects described in 1758
Taxa named by Carl Linnaeus